Antoniewicz is a surname. It derived from the Antonius root name. Notable people with this surname include the following:

Heiko Antoniewicz (born 1965), German chef 
Karol Antoniewicz (1807 – 1852), Polish Jesuit
Michał Antoniewicz (1897 – 1989), Polish equestrian

Fictional character
Mr. Antoniewicz, The Icarus Hunt villain

See also

Antoniewicz coat of arms

Notes

Patronymic surnames